The 1944 Stanley Cup Finals was a best-of-seven series between the Chicago Black Hawks and the Montreal Canadiens.

Paths to the Finals
Chicago defeated the defending champion Detroit Red Wings in a best-of-seven 4–1 to advance to the Finals. Montreal defeated the Toronto Maple Leafs in a best-of-seven 4–1 to advance to the Finals.

Game summaries
Maurice "Rocket" Richard made his Stanley Cup debut with a five-goal performance in the series, including a hat trick in game two. The Punch Line of Richard, Elmer Lach and Toe Blake scored ten of the Canadiens' 16 goals. Blake scored the Cup winner in overtime. In the same overtime, Bill Durnan stopped the first penalty shot awarded in the Finals, awarded to Virgil Johnson.

Stanley Cup engraving
The 1944 Stanley Cup was presented to Canadiens captain Toe Blake by NHL President Red Dutton following the Canadiens 5–4 overtime win over the Black Hawks in game four.

The following Canadiens players and staff had their names engraved on the Stanley Cup

1943–44 Montreal Canadiens

See also
 1943–44 NHL season
 1943–44 Chicago Black Hawks season
 1943–44 Montreal Canadiens season

References and notes

 Podnieks, Andrew; Hockey Hall of Fame (2004). Lord Stanley's Cup. Bolton, Ont.: Fenn Pub. pp 12, 50. 

Stanley Cup
Stanley Cup Finals
Chicago Blackhawks games
Montreal Canadiens games
Stanley Cup Finals
April 1944 sports events
Ice hockey competitions in Montreal
Ice hockey competitions in Chicago
1944 in Quebec
1940s in Chicago
1940s in Montreal